Lazarevo is a small town in Leninsky District in the Jewish Autonomous Oblast, Russia. It is the head of Lazarevskoye Rural Settlement.

Geography
Its population is

History
Lazarevo is the birthplace of Soviet Arctic explorer Georgy Ushakov (1901 - 1963) who fully surveyed and charted Severnaya Zemlya for the first time in history.

References

Cities and towns in the Jewish Autonomous Oblast